Tuscarora High School may refer to:

Tuscarora High School (Maryland), a school in Frederick
Tuscarora High School (Virginia), a school in Leesburg